Tulunad or Tulu Nadu, also called Bermere sristi or Parashurama Srishti, is a region and a proposed state on the southwestern coast of India. The Tulu people, known as 'Tuluva' (plural 'Tuluver'), speakers of Tulu, a Dravidian language, are the preponderant ethnic group of this region. South Canara, an erstwhile district and a historical area, encompassing the undivided territory of the contemporary Dakshina Kannada and Udupi districts of Karnataka State and Kasaragod district of Kerala state forms the cultural area of the Tuluver.

Historically, Tulu Nadu lay between the Gangavalli River (Uttara Kannada district) in the north and the Chandragiri River (Kasaragod district) in the south. Currently, Tulu Nadu consists of the  Dakshina Kannada and  Udupi districts of Karnataka state and  Kasaragod district of Kerala state. This region is not an official administrative entity.

Mangalore, the fourth largest (in terms of area and population) and a major city of Karnataka is the largest city of Tulu Nadu. Udupi and Kasaragod are the other major cities of this region.

Etymology 
According to Keralolpathi, the name Tuluva comes from that of one of the Cheraman Perumal kings of Kerala, who fixed his residence in the northern portion of his dominions just before its separation from Kerala, and who was called Tulubhan Perumal.

Mythology 
According to mythology, the district was reclaimed by Parashurama from the sea. According to the 17th-century Malayalam work Keralolpathi, the lands of Kerala and Tulu Nadu were recovered from the Arabian Sea by the axe-wielding warrior sage Parashurama, the sixth avatar of Vishnu (hence, Kerala is also called Parasurama Kshetram 'The Land of Parasurama'). Parasurama threw his axe across the sea, and the water receded as far as it reached. According to legend, this new area of land extended from Gokarna to Kanyakumari. The land which rose from sea was filled with salt and unsuitable for habitation; so Parasurama invoked the Snake King Vasuki, who spat holy poison and converted the soil into fertile lush green land. Out of respect, Vasuki and all snakes were appointed as protectors and guardians of the land. P. T. Srinivasa Iyengar theorised, that Senguttuvan may have been inspired by the Parashurama legend, which was brought by early Aryan settlers.

History

Ancient period 
According to the works of Sangam literature (300 BCE – 300 CE), Tulu Nadu was one of the 12 socio-geographical regions included in the ancient Tamilakam. Tulu Nadu must certainly at one time have formed part of ancient Kerala (Chera dynasty), where the western coastal dialect of Old Tamil (Karintamil) was spoken. It must have separated from Tamilakam sometime between 300 CE and 500 CE, when the Kadambas invaded the northern portions of Chera kingdom. No definite historical record relating to Tulu Nadu, other than those were found from Sangam literature, have been found of earlier date than 8th or 9th century CE.

Alupa dynasty 
Ptolemy, the 2nd-century geographer identifies the Tulu Nadu region as Olokhoira which is widely believed to be a corruption of the term Alva Kheda, 'the land of the Alvas'.[2] Historically, Tulu Nadu included the two separate lands of Haiva and Tuluva. The longest-ruling and oldest known native dynasty of Tulu Nadu was that of the Alupas ( 5th – 14th century CE). Their kingdom was also known as Alvakheda. They initially ruled independently and later were the feudatories of the prominent dynasties. The Kadamba dynasty of Banavasi was the earliest, under which the Alupas flourished. Later the Rashtrakutas of Manyakheta, Chalukyas of Badami, Chalukyas of Kalyani, Hoysalas of Dwarasamudra (Halebidu) and Rayas of Vijayanagara were the overlords. The Alupas, however, were independent and their subordination was nominal at best. They ruled until the Vijayanagara Empire took control of Tulu Nadu from 14th to the 17th centuries

During the rule of Vijayanagara, Tulu Nadu was administered in two parts – Mangaluru Rajya and Barkuru Rajya. Tulu Nadu was governed by the native feudatories of the Vijayanagara Empire until the 18th century. These feudatories gained power towards the end of the Alupa period. An Old Malayalam inscription (Ramanthali inscriptions), dated to 1075 CE, mentioning king Kunda Alupa, the ruler of Alupa dynasty of Mangalore, can be found at Ezhimala (the former headquarters of Mushika dynasty) near Cannanore, in the North Malabar region of Kerala.

Notable among them were the Chowtas of Ullal and Moodabidri, Ajilas of Venur (c. 1418–1800 C.E), the Savanta or Samantha Rajas of Mulki (c. 1411–1700), the Bhairarasa Odeyas of Karkala (c. 1240–1650 C.E), the Tolaharas of Suralu (c.1139-1800 C.E), the Bangas of Bangadi (c. 1410–1800 C.E.), the Rajas of Kumbla (c. 12th century – 1800 C.E) and the Rajas of Vitla (c. 1436–1800 C.E).

The region became extremely prosperous during the Vijayanagara period with Barkur and Mangalore gaining importance. After the decline of the Vijayanagara Empire, the Keladi Nayakas of Ikkeri controlled much of Tulu Nadu. Over the following many centuries, more ethnic groups migrated to the area. Konkanis from Goa arrived by sea, as Mangalore was a major port that served not only the Portuguese but also the Arabs for maritime trades. Jains were already a prominent group and even today are uniquely preserved in Tulu Nadu. Though small in number, the Jains left behind indelible reminders of their glory with temples (bastis) in (Moodabidri) and monolithic statues of Bahubali in Karkala, Venoor and Dharmasthala. In the 16th century, there was a large influx of Catholics to Tulu Nadu from Goa.

Under Portuguese rule, the region was called the Misao do Sul (Mission of the South). In the 18th century, it was conquered by Hyder Ali, the ruler of Mysore. After the British defeated Haidar's successor Tipu Sultan in 1799, the region was attached to the Madras Presidency before being reverted to the state of Mysore after independence. Mysore has since been renamed Karnataka. At the end of the 18th century, Hyder Ali and Tipu Sultan controlled the region. Mangalore played a prominent role in Tipu's battles with the British. The British gained full control in 1801, after Tipu's death in 1799. The British ruled the region with Madras (now Chennai) as its headquarters. Tipu conquered the region and the British conquered it from him. Under the British, the region was organised into the districts of North Canara and South Canara respectively.

When the states were reorganised on linguistic basis in 1956, Tulu Nadu (South Canara) which was earlier a part of Madras Presidency and North Canara which was a part of Bombay Presidency became part of the newly formed Mysore state, which was later renamed as Karnataka. Kasargod became part of the newly formed state of Kerala. The Tuluvas began demanding official language status for Tulu and a separate state named Tulu Nadu for themselves. Organisations like the Tulu Rajya Horata Samiti have taken up the cause of the Tuluvas and meetings and demonstrations were held at towns like Mangalore and Udupi to voice their demand.

Demographics 

South Kanara had a total population of 1,748,991 in 1951, of whom 76.58% were Hindus, 14.31% Muslim and 8.85% Christian. The most widely spoken language was Tulu which was the mother tongue of 40 percent of the population, followed by Malayalam which formed the mother tongue of 24 percent each of the population. Around 17 percent of the total population spoke Kannada. Around 13 percent of the population speaks Konkani as their mother tongue.

The 1908 Imperial Gazetteer of India lists South Canara, along with the Thanjavur and Ganjam districts, as the three districts of the Madras Presidency where Brahmins are most numerous.

The majority of the people were Billavas and Bunts. There were more Brahmins (12% of the population) in South Kanara than any other district of the Madras Presidency making South Kanara, along with Tanjore and Ganjam as one of the three districts of the province where Brahmins were most numerous.

The original indigenous people of the region are Tuluvas (Bunts, Billavas, Mogaveeras, Tulu gowda, Kulalas, Devadigas, Bearys, Jogis) and Malayalis in the Kasaragod Taluk (Nambudiris, Nairs, Thiyyas, Mappilas etc). The Brahmins who settled first belonged chiefly to the Sthanika and thus they were called as Tulu Brahmins. Others were Shivalli, Saraswat, Havyaka, Kotaha sub-sections, Mahars, the hill-tribes (Koragas).

Language 

The most widely spoken Language is Tulu which belongs to the Dravidian family of languages, and whose native speakers are referred to as Tuluva. The number of Tulu speakers was estimated to be about 1.7 million in 2001, although some sources quote as many as 3 million. The other languages spoken in Tulu Nadu include Kundagannada, Arebhashe, Malayalam, Konkani, Koraga and Beary.

The Tulu script, originating from the Grantha script, and bears high similarity to the Malayalam script. It was used by Tuluvas for centuries before it was eventually replaced by the Kannada script. Most Sanskrit works and Tulu classics are present in this script, with a few in other scripts. This script was used by Brahmins.

Geography and climate 

Tulu Nadu lies along the Konkan Coast. Tulu Nadu is bounded on the west by the Arabian Sea and on the east by the Western Ghats. With Chandragiri river forming a historical southern border.

Tulu Nadu also experiences heavy rainfalls during Monsoon season. The coastal area of Tulu Nadu is very rich concerning rainforests and backwaters. The region has a tropical climate; with hot and humid summers, hot winter days, and heavy monsoon.

Monsoon starts in the beginning of June, heaviest rainfall during Aati month, which spans from mid-july to mid-august. Occasional rain persists till deepawali and marnemi festivals in October-november. Winter lasts from December to early February. Summer from mid-February till May. With occasional tropical rain during April and may.

Culture 

The Yakshagana is a night-long dance and drama performance practised in Tulu Nadu with great fanfare. Pilivesha is a unique form of folk dance in the region fascinating the young and the old alike, which is performed during Marnemi (as Dussehra is called in Tulu) and Krishna Janmashtami. Karadi Vesha (Bear Dance) is one more popular dance performed during Dasara in Tulu Nadu. Daivaradhane (Spirit worship), which is usually done at night is practised here. Kambala (Buffalo race) is conducted in water filled paddy fields. The Bhuta Kola is similar to Theyyam in Kerala. Korikatta (cockfight) is another favourite sport for the people. Nagaradhane (Snake worship) is practised in the Tulu Nadu according to the popular belief of the Naga Devatha to go underground and guard the species on the top.

Udupi cuisine is popular across South India, mostly due to Udupi restaurants, which are primarily vegetarian. Apart from Southern India, there are famous Udupi Hotels in Mumbai and New Delhi too.

Economy 
Historically, Tulu Nadu was primarily dependent on agriculture and fishing. The main crops grown were rice, Bengal gram, horse gram, vegetables and fruits. Plantation crops like coconut, areca nut, cocoa, cashew nut, and pepper are also grown. In the early 20th century, the Mangalore tile industry, cashew nut processing, and the banking industry grew substantially. Tulu Nadu is called "the cradle of Indian banking". Five major banks of India (Syndicate Bank, Canara Bank, Corporation Bank, Vijaya Bank and Karnataka Bank) have their origins here.

In the early part of the 21st century the area has been transforming itself into a hub of the information technology and medical services industries. There has been large-scale decline in agriculture and related industries due to the non-availability of labour and preference for white-collar jobs. Agricultural land is being converted to commercial and real estate properties, and environmental pollution is increasing drastically due to large-scale deforestation and increase in automobile use. A public sector petroleum refinery (MRPL) was established in the 1990s. Some chemical plants (e.g., fertilizers and pesticides) have been established. This region contributes the second highest revenue to Karnataka state after the city of Bangalore. This region has an international airport at Mangalore which is well connected to the rest of India and middle eastern countries. New Mangalore Port (NMPT) is one of the major port of India located at Panambur, Mangalore.

Education 

Tulu Nadu is one of the most prominent educational hub on the western coast of India. There are hundreds of professional colleges in Tulu Nadu. Thousands of students from all over India and countries abroad study in these institutions. Mangalore and Manipal are the major cities that accommodate these students. National Institute of Technology Karnataka (NITK, Surathkal, owned by Central Government) is ranked as one of the best engineering college in Karnataka and is one among the top ten engineering colleges of India. Kasturba Medical College was ranked 9th and 21st among the medical colleges of India in the NIRF 2020 Rankings.

See also 
Tulu Nadu state movement
List of temples in Tulu Nadu
Kolathunadu

References

Further reading

External links 

Tulu Nadu – Samajika Chariteyalli ondu samshodhanatmaka Vivechane (History of Tulunadu)

 
Proposed states and union territories of India